"Follow Your Heart" is a hard rock song and the fourth track from Triumph's 1984 album Thunder Seven. It reached number 35 on the Canada pop chart; number 88 in the U.S.

The video that was shot to accompany the single was filmed live at the Providence Civic Center in Rhode Island. During the concert, the band announced they would be filming a video after the concert and the audience were free to stay around.

Personnel
 Rik Emmett – guitars, synthesizers, vocals
 Gil Moore – drums, percussion, vocals
 Michael Levine – bass guitar, keyboards, synthesizers

Production
 Eddie Kramer – producer, mixer
 Ed Stone – engineer
 Hugh Cooper – mixing
 Noel Golden – assistant engineer
 Yoshiro Kuzumaki – mastering

External links
 Follow Your Heart entry at The Official Triumph Homepage
 Follow Your Heart Video at The Official Triumph Homepage

References

1984 singles
1984 songs
MCA Records singles
Songs written by Gil Moore
Songs written by Mike Levine (musician)
Songs written by Rik Emmett
Triumph (band) songs